Hillgrove is a Northern Tablelands (New South Wales) village with population of about 95. The village is located approximately 30 km east of Armidale and is 5 kilometres south of the Waterfall Way. Hillgrove is part of the Armidale Regional Council local government area and is in Sandon County. This historic goldmining town is situated at elevation of 1,000 metres on a granite plateau above Bakers Creek and near the Oxley Wild Rivers National Park.

History
The town was first known as Eleanora Township, named after the antimony mine that for nearly a decade after 1876 was the sole reason for its existence. The name Hillgrove was given to the town in 1888. Hillgrove was one of the major gold fields in New South Wales, with a recorded production of over 15,000 kg of gold. It has also been a significant producer of antimony (14,700 tons) and tungsten (at least 2,000 tons of scheelite).

Although some alluvial gold was discovered in Bakers Creek gorge as early as 1857, it was not until antimony was discovered that important mining was undertaken in the late 1870s. The main shaft in Bakers Creek was sunk 610 metres below the surface. Tramways operated by a steam-powered winding engine pulled the trams up and down the precipitous incline to the Bakers Creek mines.

The town of Hillgrove was established in 1884 and grew rapidly during the 1880s and 1890s due to the expanding production of the mining companies. Hillgrove Post Office opened on 1 June 1884 and closed in 1979. A Hillgrove West Post Office opened in 1890, was renamed Metz in 1896 and closed in 1922. At its peak in about 1898, the town's population was close to 3,000, similar to that of Armidale. Hillgrove then had four churches, six hotels, two schools, a school of arts, a hospital, several banks, a stock exchange, a court house, police station, a recreation ground, a technical college, debating society, a temperance league and a cordial factory. The town also printed its own local paper, the Hillgrove Guardian. In 1895 it became the first town in Australia to be supplied with power by means of hydro-electricity which operated from Gara Gorge to the west.

Hillgrove began to decline after 1900. The difficulties and expense of its deep underground workings led investors and miners to seek more profitable ventures elsewhere. Gold finds were exhausted and antimony prices declined by the 1920s leading to mining companies shutting down. Shortly after most of the town's buildings were being dismantled and relocated to Armidale and other centres.
In all, the Eleanora and Bakers Creek Mines produced 15,600 kg of gold. By 1933 there were just 241 residents left.

Goldmining briefly resumed between 1937 and 1940. However, it was the Damned If I Know Mine, a small operation which extracted tungsten ore between the late 1930s and the late 1950s which turned a large profit, particularly during World War II when tungsten's steel-strengthening capacity was in great demand. Antimony mining came into its own in 1969 and was mined along with gold, this sustained the village. In March 2004, the Hillgrove Gold Project, located near Armidale, New South Wales, was purchased by Straits, who are making developmental plans for the area.

The mine is now owned by Meridian Capital of Hong Kong. In December 2015 the mine closed, largely due to a fall in antimony prices for 8,000 to 5,000 a tonne. The mine previously closed for months in 2009, again due to global price fluctuations. At that time it was owned by Straits Resources.

The post office and school are the only substantial buildings which remain. The school buildings (1897) are now used to house the Hillgrove Rural Life and Industry Museum, giving the visitor a view into the rich heritage of the past.

Hillgrove Goldmining Area and also the Antimony Mine on Stockton Rd, Hillgrove have been placed on the Register of the National Estate.

Attractions
Long Point campground is 18 km south of Hillgrove in the wilderness of Oxley Wild Rivers National Park. There are two posted walking tracks through dry rainforest and around the rim of the gorge offering good views over the Chandler and Macleay River systems. The overnight Chandler River Walk to Wollomombi starts here. Some rare Eucalyptus michaeliana (Hillgrove Gum) trees may be seen growing along the Long Point Road. These trees have a distinctive, mottled, greenish trunk with peeling yellow-brown bark (like jigsaw puzzle pieces). Its range is restricted to Mount Barney National Park in Queensland and in NSW to the Wyong and Hillgrove areas.

Bakers Creek Falls lookout is about 1.5 km from the Waterfall Way and provides views of the commencement of the Bakers Creek Gorge.

Metz, which was known as West Hillgrove, is situated on the western side of the Bakers Creek gorge from Hillgrove and has a scenic viewing platform at Metz Gorge. The good panorama here makes it possible to see some relics of the old Bakers Creek Mine at the bottom of the gorge, 490 m below Hillgrove. The shaft was sunk a further 610 m below the surface, almost to sea-level.

Hillgrove Museum is open from 10am to 2pm, Friday to Monday., and you will see the three-roomed schoolhouse, mining and agricultural equipment, and reminders of domestic life.

See also

 Australian gold rushes

Notes

References
"Hillgrove: A Photographic Study of a New South Wales Mining Town, 1893-1912" by Graham Wilson and Bruce Caddy; printed by Armidale and District Historical Society, 1996

External links
 Northern Rivers Geology Blog - Hillgrove

Mining towns in New South Wales
Towns in New England (New South Wales)
Gold mines in New South Wales
Underground mines in Australia